Rafael Enrique Romo Pérez (born February 25, 1990) is a Venezuelan professional footballer who plays as a goalkeeper for Universidad Católica.

Career 
Romo started his career at 17 years old, playing in old Venezuelan goalkeeper Gilberto Angelucci's team, the Atlético de Turén. He participated in the 2007 Venezuelan Torneo Apertura. He played against U.A. Maracaibo in the Copa Venezuela, which surprised fans and the press. On 15 July 2009, Udinese acquired the goalkeeper from Llaneros de Guanare.

Romo made his debut with Udinese in a 3–1 defeat against Lazio, on 15 May 2010.

After three years on loan at Mineros, Romo signed for Watford in August 2015 on a short-term loan deal to cover the two game suspension for Giedrius Arlauskis.

On 1 September 2019, Romo joined Danish Superliga club Silkeborg IF on a contract until June 2020.

On 27 April 2022, Romo signed with MLS side, D.C. United, on a one-and-a-half-year contract through 2023 with an option for 2024.

References

External links 
 
 

1990 births
Living people
Venezuelan footballers
Venezuela international footballers
Association football goalkeepers
Udinese Calcio players
Llaneros de Guanare players
Estudiantes de Mérida players
A.C.C.D. Mineros de Guayana players
Watford F.C. players
AEL Limassol players
APOEL FC players
K Beerschot VA players
Silkeborg IF players
Oud-Heverlee Leuven players
D.C. United players
C.D. Universidad Católica del Ecuador footballers
Serie A players
Cypriot First Division players
Belgian Pro League players
Challenger Pro League players
Venezuelan Primera División players
Danish Superliga players
Venezuelan expatriate footballers
Venezuelan expatriate sportspeople in Italy
Expatriate footballers in Italy
Venezuelan expatriate sportspeople in England
Expatriate footballers in England
Venezuelan expatriate sportspeople in Cyprus
Expatriate footballers in Cyprus
Venezuelan expatriate sportspeople in Belgium
Expatriate footballers in Belgium
Expatriate men's footballers in Denmark
Venezuelan expatriate sportspeople in the United States
Expatriate soccer players in the United States
Venezuelan expatriate sportspeople in Ecuador
Expatriate footballers in Ecuador
Major League Soccer players